Jørgen Kristensen (born 12 December 1946), nicknamed Troldmanden (the Wizard), is a Danish former football player who played professionally for a number of foreign clubs and won the 1974 UEFA Cup with Dutch club Feyenoord Rotterdam. He played as an attacking midfielder or winger, and was one of the most technical ballplayers in Danish football. He played 19 matches and scored three goals for the Denmark national football team.

Biography
Born in Hedehusene, he started playing football with a local team. He moved to Køge Boldklub at the age of 20, where he played for a year, before moving abroad to play for American team Detroit Cougars. He joined Dutch club Sparta Rotterdam, for whom he made his debut for the Denmark national team in June 1971. He moved to Sparta's inner-city rivals Feyenoord Rotterdam, and was eventually dropped from the Danish national team in November 1972. He was a part of the Feyenoord team which won the 1974 UEFA Cup, but despite playing for a successful team, he was not recalled for the Danish national team. Partly because the national team had prolific attacking players like Henning Jensen, Ulrik le Fevre, Per Røntved and not least Allan Simonsen. And partly because Kristensen had trouble in getting the time off to travel home to Denmark to play for the national team.

He moved back to Denmark to play for Køge again, and was recalled for the Danish national team in August 1976. He moved abroad once more, to play for German team Hertha BSC in September 1976. With Hertha, he finished in third place of the 1976 German Bundesliga championship and reached the 1977 German Cup final. In 1978, he returned to Denmark, to play for Næstved IF. At the end of his Danish career, he moved to the United States to play indoor soccer, playing for Wichita Wings and the Kansas City Comets.

References

External links
 Marco de los Reyes, "Troldmanden", Berlingske Tidende, 11 December 2006
Danish national team profile 

 NASL/MISL stats

1946 births
Living people
Danish men's footballers
Association football wingers
Køge Boldklub players
Calgary Boomers players
Chicago Sting (NASL) players
Detroit Cougars (soccer) players
Sparta Rotterdam players
Feyenoord players
Hertha BSC players
Tulsa Roughnecks (1978–1984) players
Kansas City Comets (original MISL) players
Wichita Wings (MISL) players
Major Indoor Soccer League (1978–1992) players
Eredivisie players
Bundesliga players
North American Soccer League (1968–1984) players
Denmark international footballers
Danish expatriate men's footballers
Expatriate soccer players in Canada
Danish expatriate sportspeople in Canada
Expatriate soccer players in the United States
Danish expatriate sportspeople in the United States
Expatriate footballers in the Netherlands
Danish expatriate sportspeople in the Netherlands
Expatriate footballers in Germany
Danish expatriate sportspeople in Germany
Footballers from Hendrik-Ido-Ambacht
UEFA Cup winning players